India competed at the 2017 Asian Indoor and Martial Arts Games held in Ashgabat, Turkmenistan from September 16 to 27. India sent a delegation consisting of 198 competitors for the event. India won a total of 40 medals in the event including 9 gold medals.

Participants

Medal table

Medallists

References 

Nations at the 2017 Asian Indoor and Martial Arts Games
2017 in Indian sport